Rinat Mukatdisovich Mardanshin (December 24, 1963 – January 19, 2005) was a Russian motorcycle speedway rider of Tatar ethnicity, who rode in the 2001 Speedway World Cup for Russia. He was a multi-medalist of the Russian Championships.

He died, on 19 January 2005, at the age of 41, during a routine operation to remove metalwork from his shoulder. It is believed he had a blood clot in his aorta.

See also 
 Russia national speedway team

External links 
 In memory of the driver 
 speedyway.ru 
 Memorial 
 Speedyway at rivera.com.ua 

1963 births
2005 deaths
People from Oktyabrsky, Republic of Bashkortostan
Russian speedway riders
Tatar people of Russia
Sportspeople from Bashkortostan